Chrysoskalitissa Monastery is a 17th-century Eastern Orthodox Christian monastery located on the southwest coast of the island of Crete, Greece. Within the municipal district of Innachori, the monastery lies about 72 kilometres southwest of Chania. Built up on rocks 35 metres above the water, it overlooks the Libyan Sea.

Features

History 
The coastal area close to the monastery promontory has several small coves that in earlier times offered welcome landing points for sailors coming to Crete from the west. There archeologists have found interesting remains of late Neolithic and Early Minoan settlements .

According to local tradition, the name of the monastery is derived from one of the ninety steps leading up to the main building. This step is said to be golden (χρυσός - chrysos in Greek) and visible only to devout Christians. The monastery is dedicated to the Holy Trinity (Aγία Τριάδα - Agia Triada) and the Dormition of Virgin Mary (Κοίμησης της Θεοτόκου - Koimisis tis Theotokou).

See also
 Elafonisi

References

Monasteries in Crete
Greek Orthodox monasteries in Greece
Christian monasteries established in the 17th century
Buildings and structures in Chania (regional unit)